Pollstar is a trade publication for the concert and live music industry. The publication was purchased by Oak View Group, a venue consultancy founded by Tim Leiweke and Irving Azoff, in July 2017.

History and profile
Founded in 1981 in Fresno, California, Pollstar is a trade publication that covers the concert industry in the United States and internationally. They supply information to professional concert promoters, booking agents, artist managers, facility executives and other entities involved in the live entertainment business. Pollstar produces a weekly print magazine for industry professionals and publishes on their website.

Pollstar previously operated a separate website for professionals, but later announced it would merge the site with Pollstar.com.

Today, Pollstar has an office in London and correspondents in six countries. The magazine is a member of the Associated Press (AP). Its subscribers receive the weekly magazine and access to its online databases.

In May 2018, Pollstar announced it was moving its headquarters from Fresno to Los Angeles. Later, in June 2018, co-founder and editor-in-chief, Gary Bongiovani, retired from the publication.

Pollstar holds an annual award ceremony to honor artists and professionals in the concert industry. In 2019, Pollstar used box office performance to determine winners of their awards for the first time. Previously, winners were chosen by industry voters.

Pollstar also produces Pollstar Live!, a three-day concert industry conference at the Beverly Hilton in Beverly Hills, CA. Originally titled the CIC – Concert Industry Consortium, it brings together a mix of talent buyers, venue managers, artist agents and managers. Conference speakers have included Garth Brooks, Jon Bon Jovi, Eddy Cue, Michael Rapino, and Nicki Minaj.

References

External links
 Official website

Music magazines published in the United States
Weekly magazines published in the United States
Magazines established in 1981
American music websites
Entertainment trade magazines
Magazines published in California